Velocifero is the fourth studio album by English electronic music band Ladytron and their first to be released by Nettwerk. The album was first released digitally on 19 May 2008, followed by a physical release on 2 June in the United Kingdom and on 3 June elsewhere.

Velocifero peaked at number 75 on the UK Albums Chart, becoming the band's second highest-charting album to date in the UK (after Gravity the Seducer reached number 72 in 2011). It was also their first album to chart on the US Billboard 200, reaching number 131. Velocifero spawned three singles: "Ghosts", "Runaway" and "Tomorrow".

Background
According to band member Reuben Wu, "velocifero" literally means "bringer of speed", and is also the name of a classic retro-styled scooter. "Black Cat" and "Kletva" are both sung entirely in Bulgarian. "Kletva" (which means "oath") is a cover of a song from a solo album by Kiril Marichkov of Bulgarian rock band Shturtzite. Daniel Hunt provided additional vocals on "Versus".

Singles
"Ghosts" was released as the album's lead single on 12 May 2008. It reached number 106 on the UK Singles Chart. The song was included on the soundtrack to the video games Need for Speed: Undercover, The Sims 2: Apartment Life (Apartment Life featured the song as an instrumental version; both in 2008) The Sims 3 (2009) and LittleBigPlanet 2 (2011), as well as on the soundtrack to the 2009 slasher film Sorority Row. The track was also used in the TV advert for the 2010 Jameson Dublin International Film Festival. A remix of "Ghosts" by New York alternative rap collective Blestenation was released as a free download on 22 August 2008 by RCRD LBL.

Critical reception

Velocifero received generally positive reviews from music critics. At Metacritic, which assigns a normalised rating out of 100 to reviews from mainstream publications, the album received an average score of 73, based on 26 reviews.

Track listing

Velocifero (Remixed & Rare)
On 6 April 2010, Nettwerk released a compilation of remixes, B-sides and rarities titled Velocifero (Remixed & Rare). The cover is the based on the black and white stripes artwork of the single "Runaway".

Personnel
Credits adapted from the liner notes of Velocifero.

Musicians
 Daniel Hunt – additional vocals (uncredited) 
 Semay Wu – cello
 Slic – drums
 Somekong (Peter Salmang and Javier Benitez) – additional musicians

Technical

 Ladytron – production
 Michael Patterson – mixing
 Vicarious Bliss – additional production
 Alessandro Cortini – additional production
 Erwan "Eq" Quinio – engineering
 Daniel Woodward – engineering
 Alex Hasson – engineering assistance

Artwork
 Stéphane Gallois – photography
 Assume Vivid Astro Focus – design
 Pipa – design

Charts

Release history

References

2008 albums
Ladytron albums
Nettwerk Records albums